Dibba Airport  is an airport serving Dibba Al-Baya, a city in the Musandam Governorate of Oman. Dibba is a harbor city on the Gulf of Oman, and is divided between Oman and United Arab Emirates.

There is mountainous terrain southwest through north, and distant hills southeast. Approach and departure may cross into Emirates airspace.

See also
Transport in Oman
List of airports in Oman

References

External links
OpenStreetMap - Dibba
OurAirports - Dibba Airport

Airports in Oman
Musandam Governorate